Tudorel is a Romanian male given name. Notable people with the name include:

Tudorel Bratu (born 1991), Romanian rugby union player
Tudorel Pelin (born 1969), Romanian footballer
Tudorel Stoica (born 1954), Romanian footballer
Tudorel Toader (born 1960), Romanian lawyer

Romanian masculine given names